The International Day of Remembrance and Tribute to the Victims of Terrorism was established by the United Nations General Assembly in 2017. It designated 21 August as the International Day of Remembrance and Tribute to the Victims of Terrorism in order to honor the victims and survivors of terrorism. In 2017 alone, nearly three-quarters of all deaths caused by terrorism were in just five countries: Afghanistan, Iraq, Nigeria, Somalia and Syria. According to a statement by the UN, the day is meant to allow victims of terrorism to have their needs supported and their rights upheld.

References

 
United Nations days
August observances